Delta Trianguli Australis (Delta TrA), Latinized from δ Trianguli Australis, is a solitary, yellow-hued star in the constellation Triangulum Australe. It has an apparent magnitude of 3.84, making it readily visible to the naked eye under ideal conditions, Parallax measurements place the object at a distance of 606 light years (182 parsecs).

Delta TrA has a stellar classification of G2 Ib-IIa — an evolved G-type star with a luminosity class intermediate between a low luminosity supergiant and a bright giant. Delta TrA has an iron abundance 89% that of the Sun, placing it around solar metallicity.

References

Trianguli Australis, Delta
Triangulum Australe
G-type bright giants
PD-63 3854
6030
145544
079664
G-type supergiants
Trianguli Australis, 25